Robert Breiter (28 March 1909 – 19 November 1985) was a Swiss ice hockey player who competed in the 1928 Winter Olympics.

He was a member of the Swiss ice hockey team, which won the bronze medal.

External links
Robert Breiter's profile at databaseOlympics.com
Robert Breiter's profile at Sports Reference.com

1909 births
1985 deaths
Ice hockey players at the 1928 Winter Olympics
Olympic ice hockey players of Switzerland
Olympic bronze medalists for Switzerland
Olympic medalists in ice hockey
Medalists at the 1928 Winter Olympics